Dykehead is a rural locality in the North Burnett Region, Queensland, Australia. In the  Dykehead had a population of 8 people.

Geography 
The Auburn River forms most of the eastern and southern boundaries, while the Burnett River forms a small portion of the eastern. The Dykehead and Auburn State Forests are within the locality.
In the south is Auburn River National Park extending across the river into neighbouring Hawkwood.

History 
In the  Dykehead had a population of 8 people.

References 

North Burnett Region
Localities in Queensland